Marta Santaolalla (27 October 1920 – 22 October 2019) was a Spanish stage, film and television actress.

Santaolalla died in October 2019 at the age of 98.

Selected filmography
 Autumn Roses (1943)
 Cristina Guzmán (1943)
 Life Begins at Midnight (1944)

References

Bibliography
 Bentley, Bernard. A Companion to Spanish Cinema. Boydell & Brewer, 2008.

External links

1922 births
2019 deaths
People from Madrid
Spanish film actresses
Spanish stage actresses
Spanish television actresses